Storeton railway station was located on the northern side of Station Road, between Barnston and Storeton, England.

History
Originally named Barnston, it opened on 18 May 1896 on the North Wales and Liverpool Railway. The station was renamed as Storeton for Barnston on 1 May 1900, and simply as Storeton in 1933. The station closed to passengers on 3 December 1951 and finally closed on 3 February 1964. The station had a 23-lever signal box, south of the road bridge, which operated the lines to the adjacent goods yard and was used until 2 July 1965.

References

Sources

Further reading

Disused railway stations in the Metropolitan Borough of Wirral
Railway stations in Great Britain opened in 1896
Railway stations in Great Britain closed in 1951
Former Great Central Railway stations